Silvio Paiva (born 13 November 1958), known as Silvinho, is a Brazilian former footballer who played as a winger. He competed in the 1984 Summer Olympics with the Brazil national under-23 football team.

Club career 
Silvinho debuted his professional football career in América in 1978 in Campeonato Paulista Série B1. He made his debut in Brazilian league play with América on 26 March 1978, in a 3–0 win against Flamengo. In the years 1979–1985 he was a player with SC Internacional. With Internacional, he won the Brazilian Premier League in 1979 and the Rio Grande do Sul – Campeonato Gaúcho state championship four times in 1981, 1982, 1983 and 1984.

With Internacional he debuted in the Brazilian football league system on 21 July 1985 in a win against Bangu AC, 1–2. In the 1st league from 1978 to 1985, he played in 91 matches, scoring 16 goals. In 1986 he started play in Portugal for the next ten years with: Sportingu, Vitórii Guimarães, Tirsense, CD Nacional, FC Paços de Ferreira and FC Maia. He ended his career in Brazil in Novo Hamburgo in 1997.

International career

National team
In 1979, he appeared in successive matches against Guatemala, Cuba, Costa Rica (goal), Puerto Rico and a second match against Cuba at the 1979 Pan American Games, where Brazil won the gold medal.

1984 Olympics
At the Olympics in Los Angeles with Brazil's Olympic team, Silvinho played in all six tournament matches defeating all competition to win for Brazil the silver medal: against Saudi Arabia (goal), Germany (goal), Morocco, Canada (goal), Italy. Defeated by France in the final.

References

External links 
 
 
 

1958 births
Living people
Brazilian footballers
Association football forwards
Campeonato Brasileiro Série A players
Campeonato Brasileiro Série B players
América Futebol Clube (SP) players
Sport Club Internacional players
Primeira Liga players
Sporting CP footballers
Vitória S.C. players
Liga Portugal 2 players
C.D. Nacional players
F.C. Paços de Ferreira players
Segunda Divisão players
F.C. Maia players
Esporte Clube Novo Hamburgo players
Olympic footballers of Brazil
Footballers at the 1984 Summer Olympics
Olympic silver medalists for Brazil
Olympic medalists in football
Expatriate footballers in Portugal
Brazilian expatriates in Portugal
Medalists at the 1984 Summer Olympics
Pan American Games gold medalists for Brazil
People from Franca
Association football midfielders
Pan American Games medalists in football
Footballers at the 1979 Pan American Games
Medalists at the 1979 Pan American Games
Footballers from São Paulo (state)